The Wayne County Regional Educational Service Agency or Wayne RESA is a regional educational service agency for schools in Wayne County, Michigan within Metro Detroit. Its headquarters is in the Wayne RESA Education Center in Wayne. It provides services such as group purchasing, computer service, and staff development. Its service sector covers 33 local school districts having approximately 20,000 teachers and 400,000 students.  the superintendent of Wayne RESA is Dr. Daveda Colbert.

References

External links

 Official site
 Wayne Regional Educational Service Agency Records, Walter P. Reuther Library

Intermediate school districts in Michigan
Educational organizations based in the United States
Education in Wayne County, Michigan
Regional education units